The 2013 I-League U20 was the fifth season of the Indian I-League U20 competition. The season took place during the I-League break between February and March. The tournament began on 6 March in Jamshedpur at the facilities which are currently used by Tata Football Academy. The stadiums were officially announced on 29 January 2013 as the JRD Tata Sports Complex and the Gopal Maidan.

Then on 6 February 2013 it was announced by I-League club Pune F.C. that the I-League U20 would be played between 15 clubs separated into 3 groups of five each with former I-League 2nd Division clubs SESA Football Academy and Tata Football Academy joining the U20 league while Pailan Arrows would not send an under-20 side to the tournament as they are already a developmental side in the I-League.

Each team played each other once in the group stage and then after 4 games the top 2 teams qualified for the Final Round in which the top team was crowned champion. The final round began on 16 March 2013.

Teams

Group stage

Group A

Group B

Group C

Final round

Top scorers

Final round

Group stage

    

The goalscorer during the Churchill Brothers - Air India match for Air India is not officially known yet.

See also
 I-League

References

I-League U20 seasons
2012–13 in Indian football